Edgar Rădulescu (27 December 1890, in Bucharest – 1977) was a Romanian general during World War II. He was a recipient of the Knight's Cross of the Iron Cross of Nazi Germany.

Awards
 Iron Cross (1939) 2nd and 1st Class
 Knight's Cross of the Iron Cross (3 July 1944)

References

 

1890 births
1977 deaths
Military personnel from Bucharest
Romanian Land Forces generals
Romanian military personnel of World War II
Recipients of the Knight's Cross of the Iron Cross